The 1955 Missouri Tigers football team was an American football team that represented the University of Missouri in the Big Seven Conference (Big 7) during the 1955 college football season. The team compiled a 1–9 record (1–5 against Big 7 opponents), finished in a tie for seventh place in the Big 7, and was outscored by its opponents by a combined total of 192 to 92. Don Faurot was the head coach for the 18th of 19 seasons. The team played its home games at Memorial Stadium in Columbia, Missouri.

The team's statistical leaders included Loyd Roll with 432 rushing yards, Dave Doane with 774 passing yards and 709 yards of total offense, Harold Burnine with 594 receiving yards, and Jim Hunter and Joe Wynn, each with 18 points scored.

Schedule

References

Missouri
Missouri Tigers football seasons
Missouri Tigers football